Arthur Fields (August 6, 1884 – March 29, 1953) was an American singer (baritone) and songwriter.

Biography
He was born Abraham Finkelstein in Philadelphia, Pennsylvania, but grew up mainly in Utica, New York. He became a professional singer as a youngster.

Around 1908, he toured with Guy Brother's Minstrel Show, and helped form a vaudeville act "Weston, Fields and Carroll".

His first hit as a songwriter was "On the Mississippi" (1912), which he wrote the music for with Harry Carroll and Ballard MacDonald supplied the lyrics. In 1914 he wrote the lyrics to "Aba Daba Honeymoon", which was revived for the 1950 M.G.M. film Two Weeks With Love and thus got a renewed popularity which brought Fields large royalty incomes during his last two years.

From 1914 onward, he recorded with many bands and for many labels and had a varied career in the recording industry. In 1918, he was popular for his performance of his "Hunting the Hun" war song. His 1919 recordings with bandleader Ford Dabney may be the very first recordings of a white singer backed by a black band. For a period Fields also formed a vocal trio with brothers Jack and Irving Kaufman, billing themselves as "The Three Kaufields". Fields also often appeared on records under pseudonyms, for example as "Mr X." on Grey Gull Records and related labels. In 1926 he recorded with Oreste Migliaccio & His Queensland Orchestra. His last records were made in the early 1940s.

Among Field's most prolific partnerships was the one with band leader and pianist Fred Hall, with whom Fields made plenty of records and co-wrote several songs, often with comic titles like "The Shoes We Have Left Are All Right", "You're My Little Rhapsody in Blue", and "I Can't Sleep in the Movies Anymore". Hall and Fields also broadcast together as Rex Cole's Mountaineers.

Retiring to Florida in 1946 he also worked in radio on WKAT Miami.

He suffered a stroke early in 1953 and was killed in a fire at Littlefield Nursing Home in Largo, Florida a little later the same year.

Selected songs
"On the Mississippi" (1912)
"Aba Daba Honeymoon" (1914)
"Over There" (1917)
"Tom, Dick and Harry and Jack (Hurry Back)"
"Hunting the Hun" (1918)
"Oh! How I Hate to Get Up in the Morning"
"When Yankee Doodle Learns to "Parlez Vous Français"" (1918)
"Oui, Oui, Marie"
"The Shoes We Have Left Are All Right"
"Good Morning Mr. Zip Zip Zip"
"How Ya Gonna Keep 'em Down on the Farm (After They've Seen Paree)?" (1919)

References

External links

Arthur Fields online biography by Tim Gracyk
 Arthur Fields recordings at the Discography of American Historical Recordings.
Song Any Old Place the Gang from archive.org
Arthur Fields cylinder recordings, from the UCSB Cylinder Audio Archive at the University of California, Santa Barbara Library.
 
 

American Jews
Blackface minstrel performers
Vaudeville performers
Victor Records artists
Vocalion Records artists
Accidental deaths in Florida
Deaths from fire in the United States
1884 births
1953 deaths
20th-century American singers